= Cambodia's Kitchen =

- Interactive map of Cambodia's Kitchen

Restaurant information
- Location: 175 Russell St, Melbourne VIC 3000

Cambodia's Kitchen is a Cambodian Australian restaurant in Melbourne, Victoria.

== Description ==
The restaurant is known for its Cambodian soups, in particular its khor ko. The interior has been described as "bare bones" and is a 44-seat diner described as a "ho-hum dining room" with decorative awnings and ornamental wicker lamp shades overhead. Pop music plays from the speakers.

The shopfront has been described as unremarkable, with Besha Rodell noting, "If you were to glance at the shopfront without paying much attention, you might not even notice Cambodia's Kitchen among the many other superficially similar spots along Russell Street."

== Reception ==
In her Herald Sun review giving the venue a 6.5/10, Kara Monssen wrote:

I often wonder why the cuisine, so inoffensively delicious, hasn’t taken off in this city like other Southeast Asian eats. But Linna and Ivanra are on to a good thing — and don’t the lunch folk know it.

Besha Rodell for The Age gave the venue a 13/20, writing:

Mostly, I hope that Cambodia's Kitchen opens people's minds and hearts to the pleasures of Cambodian food. The best possible outcome is that in coming years, we'll be able to see a wider edible representation of this country in Melbourne.

Dishes praised by reviewers included the stewed beef noodle soup, and the Cambodian fried chicken. The meat was criticised as somewhat dry, but well-seasoned.
